This article lists the winners and nominees for the NAACP Image Award for Outstanding Variety – Series or Special. Currently An Evening of Stars: Tribute to and Black Girls Rock! hold the record for most wins in this category with three each.

Winners and nominees
Winners are listed first and highlighted in bold.

1980s

1990s

2000s

2010s
{| class="wikitable" style="width:100%;"
|- style="background:#bebebe;"
! style="width:11%;"| Year
! style="width:84%;"| Series / Special
! style="width:5%;"| Ref
|-
| rowspan="6" align="center"| 2010
|- style="background:#B0C4DE"
| Michael Jackson Memorial
| rowspan="6" align="center"|
|-
| BET Awards 2009
|-
| The Mark Twain Prize: Bill Cosby
|-
| Wanda Sykes: I'ma Be Me
|-
| We Are One: The Obama Inaugural Celebration at the Lincoln Memorial
|-
| rowspan="6" align="center"| 2011
|- style="background:#B0C4DE"
| An Evening of Stars: Tribute to Lionel Richie
| rowspan="6" align="center"|
|-
| The BET Honors 2010
|-
| Beyoncé: I Am... World Tour
|-
| Black Girls Rock!
|-
| TV One Night Only: Live from the Essence Music Festival
|-
| rowspan="6" align="center"| 2012
|- style="background:#B0C4DE"
| Oprah Presents: Master Class
| rowspan="6" align="center"|
|-
| BET Awards 2011
|-
| An Evening of Stars: Tribute to Chaka Khan
|-
| Black Girls Rock!
|-
| Prince! Behind the Symbol
|-
| rowspan="6" align="center"| 2013
|- style="background:#B0C4DE"
| Black Girls Rock!
| rowspan="6" align="center"|
|-
| The First Graduating Class: Oprah Winfrey Leadership Academy for Girls
|-
| Oprah's Master Class
|-
| Oprah and the Legendary Cast of 'Roots' 35 Years Later
|-
| Verses & Flow
|-
| rowspan="6" align="center"| 2014
|- style="background:#B0C4DE"
| Black Girls Rock!| rowspan="6" align="center"|
|-
| 12 Years a Slave: A TV One Special with Cathy Hughes|-
| Key & Peele|-
| Mike Tyson: Undisputed Truth|-
| Oprah's Master Class|-
| rowspan="6" align="center"| 2015
|- style="background:#B0C4DE"
| Oprah's Master Class| rowspan="6" align="center"|
|-
| BET Awards 2014
|-
| Family Feud
|-
| On the Run Tour: Beyoncé and Jay Z
|-
| UNCF An Evening of Stars
|-
| rowspan="6" align="center"| 2016
|- style="background:#B0C4DE"
| Family Feud| rowspan="6" align="center"|
|-
| Black Girls Rock!
|-
| The Daily Show with Trevor Noah
|-
| The Nightly Show with Larry Wilmore
|-
| Oprah's Master Class
|-
| rowspan="6" align="center"| 2017
|- style="background:#B0C4DE"
| Black Girls Rock!| rowspan="6" align="center"|
|-
| Celebrity Family Feud
|-
| The Essence Black Women in Hollywood Awards 2016
|-
| Beyoncé: Lemonade
|-
| Lip Sync Battle
|-
| rowspan="6" align="center"| 2018
|- style="background:#B0C4DE"
| Lip Sync Battle| rowspan="6" align="center"|
|-
| Black Girls Rock!
|-
| Dave Chappelle: The Age of Spin & Deep in the Heart of Texas
|-
| Def Comedy Jam 25
|-
| Saturday Night Live
|-
| rowspan="6" align="center"| 2019
|- style="background:#B0C4DE"
| Black Girls Rock!| rowspan="6" align="center"|
|-
| 2 Dope Queens
|-
| Bruno Mars: 24K Magic Live at the Apollo
|-
| Saturday Night Live
|-
| Trevor Noah: Son of Patricia
|-
|}

2020s

Multiple wins and nominations
Wins3 wins An Evening of Stars: Tribute to
 Black Girls Rock!2 wins It's Showtime at the Apollo
 Oprah's Master Class

Nominations6 nominations Def Poetry Jam5 nominations An Evening of Stars: Tribute to
 Black Girls Rock!
 Oprah's Master Class
 Showtime at the Apollo4 nominations Sinbad's Summer Jam3 nominations The Chris Rock Show
 Saturday Night Live2 nominations' American Idol BET's Annual Walk of Fame Family Feud''

References

NAACP Image Awards